The interleukin-7 receptor is a protein found on the surface of cells.  It is made up of two different smaller protein chains - i.e. it is a heterodimer, and consists of two subunits, interleukin-7 receptor-α (CD127) and common-γ chain receptor (CD132). The common-γ chain receptors is shared with various cytokines, including interleukin-2, -4, -9, and -15. Interleukin-7 receptor is expressed on various cell types, including naive and memory T cells and many others.

Function 

Interleukin-7 receptor has been shown to play a critical role in the development of immune cells called lymphocytes - specifically in a process known as V(D)J recombination. This protein is also found to control the accessibility of a region of the genome that contains the T-cell receptor gamma gene, by STAT5 and histone acetylation . Knockout studies in mice suggest that blocking apoptosis is an essential function of this protein during differentiation and activation of T lymphocytes. Functional defects in this protein may be associated with the pathogenesis of severe combined immunodeficiency (SCID).

Diseases 

Several diseases are associated with Interleukin-7 receptor including T-cell acute lymphoblastic leukaemia, multiple sclerosis, rheumatoid arthritis and juvenile idiopathic arthritis.

See also
 Cluster of differentiation

References

External links
 

Type I cytokine receptors